Dennis William Soga (13 May 1917 — 22 September 2003) was a South African first-class cricketer and rugby union player.

The son of the physician Alexander Robert Bogue Soga, he was born in May 1917 at Elliotdale, Cape Province. With family connections to Scotland, Soga was educated there at Selkirk High School. Playing his club cricket for Selkirk, Soga was selected to play for the Scottish cricket team against Ireland at Edinburgh in 1936. Batting from the middle order, he was dismissed in the Scottish first innings for a single run by James Graham, while in their second innings he was dismissed for 24 runs by Eddie Ingram. In addition to playing cricket, Soga also played rugby union for Selkirk RFC. Soga later returned to South Africa, where he became a dentist. He died there at East London in September 2003. His great-grandfather was Tiyo Soga, the first black South African to be ordained.

References

External links
 

1917 births
2003 deaths
People from Mbhashe Local Municipality
South African people of Scottish descent
Xhosa people
People educated at Selkirk High School
South African rugby union players
Selkirk RFC players
South African cricketers
Scotland cricketers
South African dentists